The national debt (or government debt) of the People's Republic of China is the total amount of money owed by the central government, local governments, government branches and state organizations of China. As of 2020, China's total government debt stands at approximately  46 trillion ( 7.0 trillion), equivalent to about 45% of GDP. Standard & Poor's Global Ratings has stated Chinese local governments may have an additional  40 trillion ($5.8 trillion) in off-balance sheet debt. Furthermore, debt owed by state-owned industrial firms is another 74% of GDP according to the International Monetary Fund. The three government-owned banks (China Development Bank, Agricultural Development Bank of China and Exim Bank of China) owe a further 29% of GDP. The high debt level is a current economic issue facing China.

Size
The International Monetary Fund, the Federal Reserve Bank of St. Louis and other sources, such as the Article IV Consultation Reports, state that, at the end of 2014, the "general government gross debt"-to-GDP ratio for China was 41.54 percent. With China's 2014 GDP being  10,356.508 billion, this makes the government debt of China approximately  4.3 trillion.

The foreign debt of China, by June 2015, stood at around  1.68 trillion, according to data from the country's State Administration of Foreign Exchange as quoted by the State Council. The figure excludes the Special Administrative Regions of Hong Kong and  Macau. Chinese foreign debt denominated in the U.S. dollar was 80 percent of the total, euros 6 percent, and Japanese yen 4 percent.

Issues and concerns
By the mid-2010s, many analysts had expressed concern over the overall "size" of the Chinese government debt.
 An IMF working paper, published in 2015, states that "financial sector reforms in China are progressing at an uneven pace", adding that "progress in removing implicit state guarantees has been slower." This, according to the IMF paper, means that "with implicit state guarantees still in place, banks have little incentives to seek better projects and correctly price risk."

A 2015 International Monetary Fund report concluded that China's public debt is relatively low "and on a stable path in all standard stress tests except for the scenario with contingent liability shocks," such as "a large-scale bank recapitalization or financial system bailout to deal, for example, with a potential rise in NPLs from deleveraging."

"Shadow banking" has risen in China, posing risks to the financial system.

Chinese authorities have dismissed analysts' worries, insisting that "the country still has room to increase government debt." Finance Minister Lou Jiwei stated that China's "fiscal income is in a severe situation," yet the government "need[s] to expand the fiscal deficit, but it is hard to say how much room is appropriate."

Former Fed Chairman Ben Bernanke, earlier in 2016, commented that "the...debt pile facing China [is]  an 'internal' problem, given the majority of the borrowings was issued in local currency. Many economists have expressed the same views, dismissing worries over the size of Chinese government debt, either in absolute terms or in proportion to the nation's GDP, as "nonsensical".

Local and provincial debt
By 2015, local government entities owed a total of about 18 trillion yuan (about one-third of China's economy), mostly to state-owned banks who had made loans to the local governments "to fund risky land and property deals." The Chinese central government authorized provinces to issue at least 2.6 trillion yuan ($419 billion) in bonds in 2015 in order to stabilize the financial system. However, demand for provincial bonds from the private market was weak due to inadequate yields, and in May 2015, the central government directed state-owned lenders to buy the local bonds, creating a debt swap akin to a bailout.

In 2022, China’s 31 provincial governments had a stockpile of outstanding bonds that’s close to the Ministry of Finance’s risk threshold of 120% of income and face a maturity wall over the next five years as bonds worth almost 15 trillion yuan ($2.1 trillion) - more than 40% of their outstanding debt - fall due.

See also
Economy of China
Foreign exchange reserves of China

Notes

References

External links
Official website of the Ministry of Finance of the People's Republic of China
"An Introduction to Chinese Local Government Debt" by Xun Wu, October 2015

 
Government debt by country
Government finances in China